Ace Pijper (born 6 September 2006) is a British speedway rider with Dutch ancestry. He currently rides in the second tier of British Speedway, for the Glasgow Tigers in the SGB Championship.

Speedway career
Pijper was born in Edinburgh and although having Dutch ancestry identifies as being Scottish. In 2022 he began his speedway track career and signed signed for the Berwick Bullets for the 2022 National Development League speedway season.

After a successful season he moved up a division after being signed by Glasgow Tigers for the SGB Championship 2023. He is the first Scottish rider to ride for the club since James Grieves. He also signed for Workington Comets for the 2023 National Development League speedway season.

Family
His father is the Dutch speedway rider Theo Pijper, who is a leading rider on the Longtrack.

References 

2006 births
Living people
British speedway riders
Scottish motorcycle racers
Scottish speedway riders
Glasgow Tigers riders
Workington Comets riders